Larbaâ is a district in Blida Province, Algeria. It was named after its capital, Larbaâ.

Municipalities
The district is further divided into 2 municipalities. One of them Souhane, is the least populated one in the country:
Larbaâ
Souhane

Districts of Blida Province

fr:Larbaâ